Clint Bickham is an American voice actor and ADR script writer working with Funimation and Sentai Filmworks/Seraphim Digital. After collaborating with illustrator Priscilla Hamby on Devil's Candy, which was featured in the first volume of Rising Stars of Manga, he also worked for the manga publisher Tokyopop, writing the English adaptations of manga such as Domo and Jyu-Oh-Sei. Bickham is best known for his roles of Akihito Kanbara in Beyond the Boundary, Finland in Hetalia: Axis Powers, Renji Aso in Ef: A Fairy Tale of the Two, Mochizo Oji in Tamako Market, Teichi Niya in Dusk Maiden of Amnesia, Haru in Tsuritama, Luca in La storia della Arcana Famiglia, and Ikki Kurogane in Chivalry of a Failed Knight.

Anime

Production credits

Manga adaptation 
 Domo
 Eensy Weensy Monster
 Future Diary
 Hetalia Axis Powers (volumes 1-5)
 Maria Holic
 Jyu-Oh-Sei
 Speed Grapher

References

External links

Clint Bickham at CrystalAcids Anime Voice Actor Database

Year of birth missing (living people)
21st-century American male actors
American male voice actors
Living people
Male actors from Houston
Place of birth missing (living people)